Hongcheon Idu FC is a South Korean football club that is currently a member of the National League.

The team started out life as INGNEX FC, and applied for league membership in 2006 but its application was rejected, however it was successful the second time around and was admitted to the 2007 National League. The team initially planned to play their home games in Yeosu, but a disagreement with the Yeosu city government left them homeless for the entire season.

After failing to register in time for the 2008 season, INGNEX FC was sold to Idu Construction. They relocated the team to Hongcheon and paid the necessary registration fees to compete in the 2008 season under the new name of Hongcheon Idu FC.

Name History
2004 : Founded as INGNEX FC
2007 : Renamed Yeosu INGNEX FC
2008 : Renamed Hongcheon Idu FC

Current team squad
as of April 5, 2009

Statistics

See also
List of football clubs in South Korea

External links
National League official site
Hongcheon Idu FC at ROKfootball

Sport in Gangwon Province, South Korea
Hongcheon County
Association football clubs established in 2004
Association football clubs disestablished in 2009
2004 establishments in South Korea
2009 disestablishments in South Korea
Defunct football clubs in South Korea